Cobar Peneplain, an interim Australian bioregion, is located in New South Wales, and comprises .

The bioregion has the code COP. There are five subregions.

See also

Geography of Australia

References

Further reading
 Thackway, R and I D Cresswell (1995) An interim biogeographic regionalisation for Australia : a framework for setting priorities in the National Reserves System Cooperative Program Version 4.0 Canberra : Australian Nature Conservation Agency, Reserve Systems Unit, 1995. 

Biogeography of New South Wales
IBRA regions